St. Mary's Assumption Church is a historic church in Classical Revival style, located on Front Street in Cottonport, Louisiana. The church is now used as a parish hall.

While the original nave dates back to c.1889, the present exterior aspect of the church is largely due to c.1918 alterations, which removed the 110 foot high tower and steeple, enlarged the nave, and reworked the facade to include a front portico. When the church was converted to a parish hall, in 1958, interiors were altered as well, with removal of the altar, tabernacle screen, statuary and all its other religious accoutrements.

The church was added to the National Register of Historic Places in 1989.

References

See also
National Register of Historic Places listings in Avoyelles Parish, Louisiana

Churches in Louisiana
Churches on the National Register of Historic Places in Louisiana
Neoclassical architecture in Louisiana
Churches completed in 1918
Churches in Avoyelles Parish, Louisiana
National Register of Historic Places in Avoyelles Parish, Louisiana
Neoclassical church buildings in the United States